Lieudieu is a commune in the Isère department in southeastern France.

The former Cistercian monastery Bonnevaux Abbey was located here until its destruction in the French Revolution.

Population

See also
Communes of the Isère department

References

External links 
 

Communes of Isère
Isère communes articles needing translation from French Wikipedia